The Welsh Premier League champions are the winners of the highest league in Welsh football, which is currently the Welsh Premier League, known as the League of Wales prior to the 2002–03 season. Teams in bold are those who won the double of the Welsh Premier League Championship and Welsh Cup, those in italic are those that won the treble of the Welsh Premier League, Welsh Cup and Welsh League Cup in that season.

Champions

League of Wales (1992–2002)

Welsh Premier League (2002–2019)

Cymru Premier (2019–present)

Key:

Performances by club 
Six clubs have been champions. In bold those competing in Cymru Premier as of 2022–23 season.

Multiple trophy wins
See Double (association football) and Treble (association football)

See also
 Welsh football league system
 Football in Wales

Notes

 Completed the season unbeaten.
  Also won the FAW Premier Cup.
  The New Saints were known as Llansantffraid until 1996 and Total Network Solutions between then and 2006.
 Graham Evans was awarded the Golden Boot after Andy Moran was tested positive for a banned substance.

References
General
 
 Wales - List of Champions, RSSSF.com

Specific

Champions
Premier
Wales